College Hill is a common name for the neighborhood where a college or university is located.

In the United States (by state):
 College Hill (Fairbanks, Alaska)
 College Hill Historic District (Scottsboro, Alabama), listed on the NRHP in Alabama
 College Hill, in Columbia Heights (Washington, D.C.), original site of The George Washington University
College Hill (Tampa), a neighborhood within the City of Tampa, Florida
College Hill (Augusta, Georgia), listed on the NRHP in Georgia
 College Hill District, Bowling Green, KY, listed on the NRHP in Kentucky
 College Hill Historic District (Bowling Green, Kentucky), listed on the NRHP in Kentucky
 College Hill Historic District (Crete, Nebraska), listed on the NRHP in Nebraska
 College Hill Historic District (Greensboro, North Carolina), listed on the NRHP in North Carolina
 College Hill, Cincinnati, Ohio
North College Hill, Ohio
 College Hill, St. Louis, Missouri
 College Hill (New York), an elevation in New York
 College Hill West Historic District, Corvallis, OR, listed on the NRHP in Oregon
College Hill (Beaver Falls), a neighborhood located in Beaver Falls, Pennsylvania.
 College Hill Residential Historic District, Easton, PA, listed on the NRHP in Pennsylvania
College Hill, Providence, Rhode Island, home to Brown University and the Rhode Island School of Design
 College Hill Historic District (Providence, Rhode Island), listed on the NRHP in Rhode Island
 College Hill Historic District (Brownsville, Tennessee), listed on the NRHP in Tennessee
College Hill, Austin, original designation of the "Forty Acres" located within the Campus of the University of Texas at Austin
 College Hill Historic District (Pullman, Washington), listed on the NRHP in Washington
 College Hills Historic District, Shorewood Hills, WI, listed on the NRHP in Wisconsin

College hill may also refer to:

College Hill (TV series)

See also
College Hill Historic District (disambiguation)